Rugby station is a train station in Rugby, North Dakota served by Amtrak's Empire Builder line. The station was built in 1907 as the Great Northern Passenger Depot. In 1987 a local Lions Club chapter was among the groups involved in a restoration project for the station. The former Great Northern Depot was placed on the National Register of Historic Places on September 26, 1991.

Rugby is served daily by Amtrak's Empire Builder.  The platform, tracks, and station are all owned by BNSF Railway.

Station Layout

Bibliography

References

External links

Rugby Amtrak Station (USA Rail Guide – Train Web)
Amtrak Depot (Rugby Area Chamber of Commerce)

Amtrak stations in North Dakota
Railway stations on the National Register of Historic Places in North Dakota
Former Great Northern Railway (U.S.) stations
Railway stations in the United States opened in 1893
National Register of Historic Places in Pierce County, North Dakota
Transportation in Pierce County, North Dakota
1893 establishments in North Dakota
Rugby, North Dakota